Prem Ratan Dhan Payo is a 2015 Indian Hindi-language romantic film written and directed by Sooraj Barjatya. Produced by Rajshri Productions, it stars Salman Khan and Sonam Kapoor. Neil Nitin Mukesh, Anupam Kher, Swara Bhaskar, Deepak Dobriyal and Aashika Bhatia play supporting roles. It is the fourth collaboration between Barjatya and Khan after their previous films Maine Pyar Kiya (1989), Hum Aapke Hain Koun..! (1994) and Hum Saath Saath Hain (1999) and second between Khan and Kapoor after Saawariya (2007).

The film was released worldwide on 12 November 2015 during Diwali season. It opened to an extreme positive reception with praise for Khan's performance, background, visual effects, story, screenplay and direction. With a worldwide gross of 432 crore, it is the second highest-grossing Bollywood film of 2015 and the 20th highest-grossing Indian film. The core plot of the film is reportedly inspired by the 2012 South Korean film Masquerade, which was itself loosely based on the 1894 novel The Prisoner of Zenda by Anthony Hope.

Plot 

Yuvraj Vijay Singh (Salman Khan), a wealthy crown prince of Pritampur is soon to be crowned King. He's engaged to Rajkumari Maithili Devi (Sonam Kapoor), a princess of the royal family of the neighbouring kingdom Devgarh. But due to his stiff, stubborn nature, Vijay faces many issues with Maithili and his siblings. His rich half-sisters, Rajkumari Chandrika (Swara Bhasker) and Rajkumari Radhika (Aashika Bhatia), live in a separate rented bungalow outside the royal palace with Chandrika working as an accounts head in a municipal school, and have filed a case against Vijay for a share in the royal property, because they felt their mother  (a poet and later mistress to the late King) was wronged by the Queen when she disgraced her in the presence of all of the King's children. Furthermore, Chandrika and Maithili, who were best friends during school times, find their friendship shattered owing to her engagement with Vijay. Similarly, his half brother Yuvraj Ajay Singh (Neil Nitin Mukesh) vows vengeance and has been wanting to kill him and take the crown for himself. He enlists the help of his manager Chirag Singh (Armaan Kohli) and Vijay's secretary Sameera (Samaira Rao), Chirag is misguiding Ajay at every step while betraying him at his back. Vijay barely escapes an assassination plan coordinated by Ajay and Chirag to kill him but is badly injured. He is hidden in a secret chamber maintained by two doctors.

Meanwhile, Vijay's doppelganger Prem Raghuvanshi aka Prem Dilwale (Salman Khan), a love guru, a perky, lively and carefree stage actor who falls in love with Princess Maithili, reaches Pritampur to meet her along with his friend Kanhaiya (Deepak Dobriyal). At a bus stop, the Security Head of Pritampur Palace, Sanjay (Deepraj Rana), notices him by chance and takes him to Diwan Sahab (Anupam Kher). Upon witnessing the striking resemblance between Prem and Yuvraj Vijay, Diwan asks Prem to take Yuvraj Vijay's place while Yuvraj recovers from coma. Prem acts as Yuvraj Vijay but with his simple, caring nature, he impresses Maithili who earlier wanted to break up with Vijay and falls in love with Prem unknowingly. Prem also attempts to reconcile with Vijay's sisters by bringing them back to the royal palace; he prepares legal documents handing over all of the royal family's properties to them. His half-sisters are so moved by this gesture that, with a little push from Maithili, they eventually have a change of heart and decline to deprive the prince of his fortune and reconcile with him as his sisters.

Meanwhile, Yuvraj Ajay and Chirag find out that Prem is only playing the part of the prince and thus they kidnap the real Vijay. Chirag decides to double cross Ajay, as he frees Vijay and feeds him false information to pit him against Ajay and Prem. Vijay and Ajay get involved in a sword fight when Prem and Kanhaiya intervene and clear the confusion. Chirag tries to shoot them down but falls to his death. Ajay regrets his deeds and Vijay reconciles with him. Maithili is shocked to know the truth about Prem not being Yuvraj Vijay after Prem has left to return to his home and is left heartbroken. In the end, the royal family reaches Prem's house to reunite Prem and Maithili, and they happily marry along with Kanhaiyya and Sameera.

Cast 

 Salman Khan in a dual role as
 Prem Raghuvanshi aka Prem Dilwale: An Ayodhya based love guru; Kanhaiya's friend; Maithili's husband
 Yuvraj Vijay Singh: Crown prince of Pritampur; Dhananjay and Nandita's son; Ajay, Chandrika and Radhika's half-brother; Maithili's ex-fiancé
 Sonam Kapoor as Rajkumari Maithili Devi Singh Raghuvanshi: Crown princess of neighbouring kingdom Devgarh; Chandrika's friend; Vijay's ex-fiancé; Prem's wife
 Neil Nitin Mukesh as Yuvraj Ajay Singh: Dhananjay and Bhagwanti's son; Vijay's half-brother and enemy; also Chandrika and Radhika's half-brother
 Anupam Kher as Jagdish "Bapu" Diwan / Diwan Sahab
 Armaan Kohli as Chirag Singh: C.E.O of Pritampur Empire Properties
 Deepak Dobriyal as Kanhaiya "Musoorie" Chaturvedi: Prem's friend; Sameera's husband
 Samaira Rao as Sameera Sharma: Chirag and Ajay's agent; Kanhaiya's wife
 Swara Bhaskar as Rajkumari Chandrika Singh: Dhananjay and Sangeeta's elder daughter; Vijay and Ajay's half-sister; Radhika's sister; Maithili's friend
 Aashika Bhatia as Rajkumari Radhika Singh: Dhananjay and Sangeeta's younger daughter; Vijay and Ajay's half-sister; Chandrika's sister
 Deepraj Rana as Sanjay: Head of security of the Royal Palace
 Sanjay Mishra as Gopinath Chaubey: Head of the drama troupe
 Mukesh S Bhatt as Chuttan
 S M Zaheer as Dr. Farooq Ansari
 Micky Makhijja as Dr. Pankaj Nambiar
 Manoj Joshi as Bhuvnesh Bhandari: Advocate of Pritampur royal family
 Suhasini Mulay as Savitri "Dadisa" Devi: Maithili's grandmother
 Md Jakir Hossain as Prem Friend
 Yash Abbad as Rajkumar of Rajasthan

Special appearances 

 Sameer Dharmadhikari as Raja Dhananjay Maan Singh: King of Pritampur; Bhagwanti, Nandita and Sangeeta's husband; Vijay, Ajay, Chandrika and Radhika's father
 Lata Sabharwal as Sangeeta Devi Singh: A singer and courtesan of the Royal Family; Dhananjay's mistress turned third wife; Chandrika and Radhika's mother
 Karuna Pandey as Maharani Bhagwanti Singh: Queen of Pritampur; Dhananjay's second wife; Ajay's mother
 Namrata Thapa as NGO Worker
 Yuvika Chaudhary as Unknown Girl
 Bikramjeet Kanwarpal as Estate Agent
 Alok Pandey as Manish "Monty" Verma

Production

Development 
It was announced in June 2013 by Salman Khan and Sooraj Barjatya and pre-production work of the film began in January 2014 until June 2014. It was titled Bade Bhaiya and later changed to Prem Ratan Dhan Payo, an inspired of mythological Ram Ratan Dhan Payo. Himesh Reshammiya, V. Manikandan and Sanjay Sankala roped as a music composer, cinematographer and editor in the film.

Casting 

Initially, Anushka Sharma, Sonakshi Sinha, Kareena Kapoor, Daisy Shah and Deepika Padukone were rumoured to play leading ladies and they turned down the offer. Finally, Sonam Kapoor was signed and to play a leading lady in this film and marked her second film with Khan after 2007 film Saawariya, helmed by Sanjay Leela Bhansali. Neil Nitin Mukesh, Anupam Kher, Armaan Kohli, Deepak Dobriyal, Samaira Rao and Swara Bhaskar were signed to play supporting characters. Amrita Rao was considered to play Khan's half-sister and her role went to Bhaskar. Previously, Rao acted in Vivah.

Filming 
Filming began after 1000 days of preparation on 26 June 2014 and wrapped on 2 September 2015 after 200 days of shoot. It was shot in Rajkot, Gondal, Udaipur, Athirapally Falls and Mumbai. It was shot at several extravagant locations across India. From grand sets to elaborate costumes, Prem Ratan Dhan Payo was undeniably a visual delight for all the viewers. The makers of the film released a 'behind-the-scene' video from the film titled 'Larger Than Life', wherein they revealed that the royal palace of Pritampur in the film is 'one of the biggest sets ever made' which was spread around 100,000 sq. feet. Each actor from the film is also heard speaking about the lavish scale of the film with each shot being 'grand'. Production Designer Nitin Chandrakant Desai said that "An attempt to give life to each element has been made.

Release 
Prem Ratan Dhan Payo was dubbed and released in Tamil as Meimarandhen Paaraayo (See, I've lost myself) and Telugu as Prema Leela (Love games).

Critical reception 

Taran Adarsh of Bollywood Hungama gave the film 4.5/5 stating that "On the whole, PRDP is the perfect Diwali entertainer for the entire family. The film will win abundant love [prem], while its investors will reap a harvest [dhan], making it a memorable Diwali for all concerned." Srijana Mitra Das of Times of India rated the film with 3.5/5 stars stating that PRDP is Salman Khan's triumph and he " simply blows the top off the theatres with a double role that makes you laugh, gasp, sigh – and cry." She also appreciated the performance of Sonam Kapoor, Deepak Dobriyal, Aashika Bhatia and Swara Bhaskar. Sonia Chopra of Sify gave 3/5 stars rating saying that the film has its faults, but with actor Salman Khan's dual role, the movie is sure to hit the right spots with the family audience. Rajeev Masand of CNN-IBN gave the film a rating of 3/5 stars saying that the director employed the same successful formula he had tried in his previous films, but now "the tropes have gotten rusty, the emotions seldom feel genuine, and the writing is strictly surface level". He concluded that the film's only saving grace is the presence of Salman Khan who is in good form.

Shubhra Gupta of Indian Express gave the film a low rating of 1.5/5 stars, calling it a re-imagining of Ramayan and its million stories, criticizing it as "an out-dated, overblown rehash of the director's previous films", while Rohit Vats of Hindustan Times gave the film only 2/5 stars, calling it "as a film straight out of the '80s" rehashing the director's same formula, but appreciated music director Himesh Reshammiya and lead actor Salman Khan as "quite likeable and his comic timing has gotten better". Anna MM Vetticad of First Post thrashed the film as "half-baked, lifeless, low-IQ film with its juvenile humour and family politics that resembles circumstances in the cheapest saas-bahu soaps now running on Hindi fiction TV." and "lacks even the few qualities that made his earlier ventures bearable". Sukanya Verma of Rediff.com rated the film a 2.5/5 stars stating, "PRDP sticks to its beliefs on sibling affection, family values and coy courtship and takes a lengthy route to assert so. Yet it is not the predictability but the lop-sided sentimentality of the director's narrative that hurts PRDP's intentions the most." She criticized the director for recycling "men versus women sporting contests, midnight kitchen rendezvous and the pristine aura of Prem", but appreciated the performance of Salman Khan even though it never matched his previous Bajrangi Bhaijaan act.

Box office

India 
Prem Ratan Dhan Payo collected  net on its opening day and became highest opener of the year by beating the record previously held by Bajrangi Bhaijaan. On its second day the film saw a 25% drop in its business as it collected  net, the highest non-holiday second day ever.
The film collected  net on its third day which is also the highest non-holiday third day ever to take its three-day total to  net.
On its fourth day the film collected  net to take its extended opening weekend total to  net which is the highest four-day total for a Hindi movie beating the previous records of Bajrangi Bhaijaan and Dhoom 3.
The film dropped on its fifth day as it collected  net.
The film collected  on its seventh day to take its seven-day total to  net and beat the first-week records of Kick and Chennai Express.
The film collected  net in its extended first week which is the fourth-highest first week collection of all time.
The film grossed  in Mumbai circuit alone from its first week and earned second-highest first week gross in that circuit after PK.

The film collected ,  net on its second Friday and Saturday, respectively.
On its second Sunday the film collected  net to take its total to  net after the second weekend.
With this total, the film made 100% profit for the producers.

The film collected  nett in its third weekend to take its total to  net.

Overseas 
The film grossed $1.6 million(10.62 crores) on its opening day at overseas.
The two days total of the film was $3.87 million(25.58 crores).
The film grossed $8.9 million (59 crores) in its first four days from International Markets.
After its second weekend the film grossed $13.04 million (86.57 crores) at International Markets. It has beaten the lifetime international business record of "Baahubali: The Beginning" in 11 days. "Prem Ratan Dhan Payo" has managed to retain maximum number of cinema halls that it was holding in its opening week, but its business has dropped by over 75% in the key international markets.

In its second weekend, "Prem Ratan Dhan Payo" has grossed $438,662 from 283 screens in the US, US$163,382 from 24 screens in Canada, £2,16,899 from 103 screens in the UK, A$1,18,146 from 30 screens in Australia, NZ$99,180 from 27 screens in New Zealand, MYR29,788 from 16 screens in Malaysia and €3,650 from 21 in Germany."Prem Ratan Dhan Payo" has collected a total of $13.04 million (Rs 86.57 crore) at the overseas box office in 11 days.
The film grossed $14.10 million(94 crores) after its third weekend.

Music 

The full music album of Prem Ratan Dhan Payo was released on 10 October 2015.
Sanjoy Chowdhury composed the original background score, while Reshammiya was credited for the themes based score on his songs.

Critical response 
Critic Aelina Kapoor of Rediff.com gave the album 3.5 stars out of 5, saying that "the music of 'Prem Ratan Dhan Payo' is well done, has a strong traditional flavour, have a paarivaarik feel and is exactly what the filmmaker ordered." Joginder Tuteja of Bollywood Hungama gave the album a score 4.5 out of 5 and stated that Himesh Reshammiya has delivered his "best ever in his musical career" and "the soundtrack exceeds the massive expectations one had from it." He described the album as brilliant, and praised the lyrics by Irshad Kamil.

Kasmin Fernandes of The Times of India gave the album 4/5 and complimented that "music of the film is pleasant and is reminiscent of jubilant songs from the 1990s." She however, adored the lyrics by Irshad Kamil. Critic R. M. Vijayakar in his review for India-West assigned a score of 3.5 out of 5 to the soundtrack. He summarised that "the score deserves 'hosannas' for its courage and conviction in delivering deep and rich Indian melody, good poetry and thematic veracity against today's depraved trends." He also pointed that the album is a pure one, without any "crass words, western beats, rap, and multiple music makers!"

In his critical review for The New Indian Express, Vipin Nair awards the album a score of 6.5 out of 10. He stated that the album might "be a hit with the people who love 90s Bollywood melodies." However, he also pointed that it is a bit dated. Surabhi Redkar for Koimoi.com assigned the album a low rating of 2 stars out of 5 stating the soundtrack "may be better with visuals."

Awards

Game 
An official game titled "Prem Game", based on this film has been released by Hungama Digital Services, for Android mobile phone users.

See also 
 Bollywood 100 Crore Club
 List of highest-grossing Indian films

References

External links 
 
 
 
 

2015 films
2010s Hindi-language films
Indian romantic drama films
Rajshri Productions films
Films about royalty
Films about siblings
Films based on The Prisoner of Zenda
Films based on British novels
Films set in Rajasthan
Films shot in Rajasthan
Films shot in Uttar Pradesh
Films directed by Sooraj Barjatya
Films scored by Himesh Reshammiya
Films shot in Gujarat
2015 romantic drama films
Films scored by Sanjoy Chowdhury
Fox Star Studios films
Films about lookalikes